The Paadal Petra Sthalam, also known as Tevara Sthalam, are 276 temples that are revered in the verses of Shaiva Nayanars in the 6th-9th century CE and are amongst the greatest Shiva temples of the continent. The Divya Desams by comparison are the 108 Vishnu temples glorified in the poems of the contemporary Vaishnava Alvars of Tamil Nadu, India.

Tevaram

Tevaram literally means "garland of divine songs" and refers to the collection of verses sung praising Shiva, the primary god of the Shaivite sect of Hindu religion, by three Tamil poets known as Shaiva Kuruvars - Thirugnana Sambanthar, Tirunavukkarasar (aka Appar) and Sundaramoorthy Nayanar (aka Sundarar). The three are considered the primary three among the sixty three Nayanmars of the Saivite sect of Hinduism. The former two lived during the 7th century CE while the latter around 8th century CE. All songs in Tevaram are believed to be in sets of ten songs, called pathikam in Tamil. Some musical experts consider Tevaram as a divine musical form. There is a common view that Sanskritization of names of the temples are carried out in later period that superseded the names mentioned in Tevaram - some of the common examples are Chidambaram as against Tillai in Tevaram and Kumbakonam as against Kudanthai.

The 275 temples that are mentioned in Tevaram are referred as Paadal Petra Thalam, meaning the temples that were sung in the verses. On the contrary, Vaippu Sthalam are temples that were mentioned casually in the songs in Tevaram and lacking a mention of those temples. In modern times, the verses of Tevaram are sung daily and during the festive occasions in most Shiva temples in Tamil Nadu by musicians called Odhuvars.

Thiruvasagam
Manikkavacakar is considered the 4th in the line of Shaiva Kuravars, whose verses are classified as Thiruvasagam. There is a saying that "Thiruvasagathuku urugar, oru vasagathukum orugar" meaning the person who does not budge for thiruvasagam won't budge for anything else.

Description
There are around 276 temples that are revered by the verses of Shaiva Nayanmars and are amongst the greatest Shiva Temples of Tamil Nadu.  267 temples in Tamil Nadu , 2 temples in Andhra pradesh, 1 temple in kerala, 1 temple in karnataka, 2 temples in Uttarakhand, 2 temples in Sri Lanka, 1 temple in Nepal, and Tirukailayam in Mount Kailash. The list is as shown below.

Pancha Bootha Thalangal 

This refers to the temples that are the manifestation of the five elements - land, water, air, sky, fire.

Pancha Bhoota stalam Map

Pancha Sabhai Thalangal 

The temples where Shiva is believed to have performed the Cosmic Dance.

Pancha Sabhai Map

Ashta Veerattam Thalangal 

The temples where Shiva is believed to have performed with fury. The eight temples are in 
1. Thiruvadhikai
2. Thirukoyilur
3. Thirukkadayur
4. Vazhoovur
5. Thirukkurakaval ( kurukkai )
6. Thiruppaliyalur
7. Thirukandiyur
8. Thiruvirkudi.

Sapta Vidangam
The Thyagarajar Temple at Tiruvarur is famous for the ajapa natanam (dance without chanting), that is executed by the deity itself.  According to legend, a Chola king named Mucukunta obtained a boon from Indra (a celestial deity) and wished to receive an image of Thyagaraja Swamy (presiding deity, Shiva in the temple) reposing on the chest of reclining Vishnu. Indra tried to misguide the king and had six other images made, but the king chose the right image at Tiruvarur. The other six images were installed in ThiruNallaaru, Nagapattinam, Tirukarayil, Tirukolili, Thiruvaaimur and Tirumaraikadu.  All the seven places are villages situated in the river Cauvery delta.  All seven Thyagaraja images are said to dance when taken in procession (it is the bearers of the processional deity who actually dance). The temples with dance styles are regarded as Sapta Vidangam (seven dance moves) and the related temples are as under:

Sapta Stanam
The sapthasthanam festival is conducted at Tiruvaiyaru during April every year. Hundreds of people witness the convergence of seven glass palanquins carrying principal deities of respective temples from seven places at Tiruvaiyaru. The palanquins are paraded near the car stand, the crowd witnessed the Poochorithal(flower festival) in which a doll offers flowers to the principal deities in the palanquins. After the Poochorithal, the palanquins leave for their respective places.
The seven temples are

Sapta Mangai Stalangal
The seven temples are:

Aathara Stalam

Aathara Stalam indicates the places that serve as the personifications of tantric chakras associated with the human anatomy.  Annamalaiyar temple is called the Manipooraga stalam associated with Manipooraga, regarded to be the human anatomical cause for spiritual ignorance, thirst, jealousy, treachery, shame, fear, disgust, delusion, foolishness, and sadness. Four temples are located in Tamil Nadu, one in Andhra Pradesh, and one at Varanasi.

Gallery

See also
 Shiva Temples of Tamil Nadu
 Iconography of Shiva temples in Tamil Nadu

External
 Map of padal petra stalam
 Padal petra stalam around Madurai
 Padal petra stalam around Kerala
 Padal petra stalam around Karnataka
 Padal petra stalam around Erode
 Padal petra stalam around Srilanka

Notes

References

Hindu temples in Tamil Nadu